Damián Álvarez might refer to:

Damián Álvarez (footballer, born 1973), Mexican football forward
Damián Álvarez (footballer, born 1979), Mexican football winger